Monte Penello is a mountain in Liguria, northern Italy, part of the Ligurian Apennines.  It is located in the province of Genoa. It lies at an altitude of 995 metres.

Hiking 
The summit can be reached from the Alta Via dei Monti Liguri following a brief connection foothpath.

References

Mountains of Liguria
Mountains under 1000 metres
Mountains of the Apennines